Juan Díaz (1480–1549), born in Seville, Spain, was a 16th-century conquistador and the chaplain of the 1518 Grijalva expedition, the Itinerario (itinerary route) of which he wrote.

He was one of the first Spaniards who explored the named Isla de Sacrificios near Veracruz in Mexico, where the expedition found evidence of human sacrifice.

See also
 Human sacrifice in Aztec culture

External links
 Itinerario de la armada del rey católico a la isla de Yucatán..., text of Díaz's account, reproduced at Biblioteca Virtual Miguel de Cervantes from edn published by Joaquín García Icazbalceta   
  The Grijalva Expedition (1518)

1480 births
1549 deaths
Spanish conquistadors
History of the Aztecs
16th-century Spanish people
16th-century Mesoamericanists
Historians of Mesoamerica